Statistics of Japan Soccer League for the 1988–89 season.

First Division
For the first time, the format of three points for a win was adopted, but only for the First Division. Nissan won their first title.

Four-time champion Mitsubishi was relegated for the first time, along with struggling Sumitomo.

Second Division
This was the last season in which the second tier was contested in an East-and-West format. Toshiba won a second championship, but this time their promotion was automatic. Fallen giant Hitachi, still adjusting to the change in town, joined them. Regional outfits Fujieda Municipal and NTT Kansai went back to their regional leagues.

First stage

East

West

Second stage

Promotion Group

Relegation Group

East

West

9th-16th Places Playoff

References
Japan - List of final tables (RSSSF)

Japan Soccer League seasons
1989 in Japanese football leagues
1988 in Japanese football
Japan Soccer League